Quitirrisí is a district of the Mora canton, in the San José province of Costa Rica.

The district itself includes the Huetar indigenous territory of Quitirrisí.
 One of the touristic attractions of the district is the Rancho Biriteca, a cultural center to rescue and approach to the Huetar culture and handcrafting traditions.
 Handcrafted chests, hats and hammocks can be found and purchased in many indigenous-owned stores everywhere in the district.

History 
Quitirrisí was created on 11 September 2014 by the Law 9269.

Geography 
Quitirrisí has an area of  km² and an elevation of  metres.

Demographics 

For the 2011 census, Quitirrisí had not been created and therefore there are no census data before 2014.

Transportation

Road transportation 
The district is covered by the following road routes:
 National Route 239

References 

Districts of San José Province
Populated places in San José Province